The Milford Branch was a railroad line in Massachusetts. The line formerly ran from Milford to Framingham, traveling through Holliston and Sherborn, connecting to the Boston Subdivision in Framingham and the Milford Secondary  in Milford. The line was originally part of the Boston and Albany Railroad, and the end of the line was later abandoned under Penn Central, before the rest of the line was abandoned by Conrail. Although the line passes through Sherborn and terminates in Framingham, the majority of the line lies in Holliston.

Recent history
In recent years, the track bed in Milford and Holliston was converted to a rail trail. The trail is part of the Upper Charles Rail Trail system. The trail will be extended into Sherborn until it reaches the Holliston Industrial Track, a defunct railroad with old tracks.

References

External links

Rail infrastructure in Massachusetts
Transportation in Worcester County, Massachusetts
Transportation in Middlesex County, Massachusetts
Rail trails in Massachusetts
Boston and Albany Railroad lines
Closed railway lines in the United States